= Broken Door =

Swedish musical duo

- Origin: Sweden
- Genres: Hard Rock/Metal
- Years active: 2006–present
- Labels: Metronome / Warner Music.
- Members: Tobias Östlund; Pier Schmid

Broken Door is a Swedish musical pop / rock duo made up of Pier Schmid and Tobias Östlund. They are signed to Metronome / Warner Music.

The duo who had both studied music met in late 2006 for a possible cooperation. Pier Schmid had a number of hits earlier and a long experience in jazz. He is the songwriter half of the duo, and does the backing vocals. Tobias Östlund was a vocalist in various genres like rock, jazz, soul and had taken part in musicals. He is the main vocalist for Broken Door. The duo had their first major gig in January 2008 in Karlstad, Sweden.

Their debut single was "Angel" that reached #8 in Swedish Singles Chart. Their debut album Time for Changes debuted at #13 on its first week of release.

== Discography ==
=== Albums ===
Year	Album	Peak	Certification
Year	Album	SWE	Certification
2012	Time for Changes	13	

=== Singles ===
Year	Song	Peak	Certification	Album
Year	Song	SWE	Certification	Album
2010	"Angel"	8		
2012	"Hey You"	—		Time for Changes

== Videography ==
- 2008: "Angel"
- 2009: "In the Shadow"
- 2012: "Time for Changes"
